Phillipsburg Union Station is an inactive railroad station in Phillipsburg, New Jersey, United States, at 178 South Main Street. Opened in 1914, Union Station was built by the Delaware, Lackawanna & Western Railroad (DL&W) and shared with the Central Railroad of New Jersey (CNJ) and was situated where the lines merged before the bridge crossing the Delaware River. Designed by Frank J. Nies, the architect who produced many of DL&W stations now listed state and federal registers of historic places, the 2 1/2 story, 3 bay brick building is unusual example of a union station and a representation of early 20th century Prairie style architecture. The Phillipsburg Union Signal Tower, or PU Tower, is nearby.

History

Situated at the confluence of the Delaware River and the Lehigh River, Phillipsburg has historically been a major transportation hub. From the 1820s to 1920s, it was the western terminus of the Morris Canal, which connected it by water eastward to the Port of New York and New Jersey and westward via the Lehigh Canal across the Delaware River.

Five major railroads converged in Phillipsburg: the Central Railroad of New Jersey (CNJ), which first ran in 1852, the DL&W's Morris and Essex Railroad, the Lehigh & Hudson River Railroad (L&HR), Lehigh Valley Railroad (LVRR), and the Pennsylvania Railroad's (PRR) Belvidere Delaware Railroad.

The South Easton and Phillipsburg Railroad of New Jersey, and the South Easton and Phillipsburg Railroad of Pennsylvania was organized on July 25, 1889 to build a bridge over the Delaware River between Easton, Pennsylvania and Phillipsburg. The former built 460' on the New Jersey side, while the latter built 850' on the Pennsylvania side. Bridge construction began on November 19, 1889, and concluded the following year on October 2. Subsequently, the L&HR obtained trackage rights over 13 miles of the Pennsylvania Railroad's (PRR) Belvidere Delaware Railroad between Phillipsburg and Belvidere; once the bridge was completed, the L&HR had a continuous line from Maybrook, New York to Easton. At Easton, an interchange could be made with the Central Railroad of New Jersey and Lehigh Valley Railroad, while interchange with the PRR was at Phillipsburg. In 1908, L&HR lost the trackage rights from Phillipsburg to Belvidere as PRR took them back.

After the 1911 opening of the Lackawanna Cut-Off, the DL&W ran services on the Phillipsburg Branch of what became known as the Lackawanna Old Road. In April 1970, its successor Erie Lackawanna Railway (EL) abandoned the line. CNJ passenger service ran until the 1960s, its final named train being the Harrisburg-Jersey City Queen of the Valley. Passenger service ended in 1970, only to resume in 1976 under Conrail as part of the Raritan Valley Line. NJ Transit, successor to Conrail as operator, discontinued service between Phillipsburg and High Bridge on December 30, 1983. The physical connection of the Raritan Valley Line to Phillipsburg was severed in 1989. The CNJ line and bridge, owned by NJ Transit, became part of Norfolk Southern's Lehigh Line.

Status, rail trail and service restoration studies

Union Station received of certificate of eligibility for listing on state and national registers of historic places from the State Historic Preservation Office in November 2003 (ID#4228). The New Jersey Transportation Heritage Center operated a mini museum and information center, performed some renovations, and built a collection.
 
The Phillipsburg Union Signal Tower, which controlled movement to the station and was taken out of service by New Jersey Transit in 1983, has also undergone some restoration.

An extension of New Jersey Transit Rail Operations Raritan Valley Line from High Bridge station through Glen Gardner, Hampton, Bloomsbury/Bethlehem, NJ and Phillipsburg, in connection with the Norfolk Southern Lehigh Line into Northampton County Pennsylvania, has been considered. In 2010, Easton Mayor Sal Panto Jr. promoted the restoration of rail service to Easton or Phillipsburg and possibly Allentown or Bethlehem.

Studies have also been conducted to connect the station to rail trails.

The freight line, the Washington Secondary, passes the station, but is limited in what traffic it can carry due to height restrictions presented by the bridge at the station.

See also
List of stations on the Central Railroad of New Jersey
Washington station (New Jersey)
Lackawanna Old Road
Northampton Street Bridge
List of bridges documented by the Historic American Engineering Record in New Jersey
Belvidere and Delaware River Railway

References

External links

 NJ TRANSPORTATION HERITAGE CENTER

Flicker

Former railway stations in New Jersey
Former Central Railroad of New Jersey stations
Former Delaware, Lackawanna and Western Railroad stations
Former NJ Transit stations
Union stations in the United States
Phillipsburg, New Jersey
Railway stations closed in 1983
Railway stations in the United States opened in 1914
Repurposed railway stations in the United States